Dongducheon Jungang Station is a train station on the Seoul Subway Line 1 and the Gyeongwon Line. The name means Dongducheon Central Station. It was also once known as Eosu-dong Station.

Platforms
 Platform 1: to Hoegi (Rapid Line)
 Platform 2: to Ganeung / Seoul Station / Incheon
 Platform 3: to Soyosan / Dongducheon
 Platform 4: to Dongducheon (Rapid Line)

Exits
 Exit 1: Saengyeon Post Office, Bus Terminal, Sadong Elementary School, Eosusageori, Dongducheon Public Health Center, Jangangjaerae Market, Jungang-dong Community Center, National Health Insurance Corporation
 Exit 2: Parking Lot
 Exit 3: Dongducheon City Hall, Dongducheon Regional Meteorological Office, Dongduchon Middle School, Dongducheon High School, Saengyeongeullin Park, Saengyeon Elementary School, Dongducheon Girls' Middle School
 Exit 4: Parking Lot

References 

Seoul Metropolitan Subway stations
Railway stations opened in 1911
Metro stations in Dongducheon
Seoul Subway Line 1